Dadeh Olum (also Romanized as Dādeh Olūm; also known as Dādeh Deh and Dadeh) is a village in Kerend Rural District, Dashli Borun District, Gonbad-e Qabus County, Golestan Province, Iran. At the 2006 census, its population was 289, in 50 families.

References 

Populated places in Gonbad-e Kavus County